The Mexico men's national under-18 ice hockey team is the men's national under-18 ice hockey team of Mexico. The team is controlled by the Mexico Ice Hockey Federation, a member of the International Ice Hockey Federation. The team represents Mexico at the IIHF World U18 Championships.

International competitions

IIHF Asian Oceanic U18 Championships

1991: 5th place

IIHF World U18 Championships

2003: 2nd in Division III Group A
2004: 1st in Division III
2005: 4th in Division II Group B
2006: 5th in Division II Group B
2007: 6th in Division II Group A
2008: 1st in Division III Group A
2009: 6th in Division II Group A
2010: 2nd in Division III Group B
2011: 2nd in Division III Group B

2012: 3rd in Division III
2013: 5th in Division III Group A
2014: 5th in Division III Group A
2015: 2nd in Division III Group A
2016: 6th in Division III Group A
2017: 1st in Division III Group B

External links
Mexico at IIHF.com

Ice hockey in Mexico
National under-18 ice hockey teams
Ice hockey